Guild of the Asbestos Weaver is the eighth studio album by English musician Alexander Tucker. It was released on 23 August 2019 by Thrill Jockey.

The album is inspired by the 1953 novel Fahrenheit 451 by Ray Bradbury, and references H. P. Lovecraft and Alan Moore.

Critical reception
Guild of the Asbestos Weaver was met with generally favorable reviews from critics. At Metacritic, which assigns a weighted average rating out of 100 to reviews from mainstream publications, this release received an average score of 74, based on 7 reviews.

Track listing

References

2019 albums
Thrill Jockey albums
Avant-pop albums